DC Comics has produced many crossover stories combining characters from different series of comics. Some of these are set in the fictional DC Universe, or any number of settings within the DC Multiverse.

Publication history

Pre-Crisis

Crisis on Infinite Earths and Post-Crisis

Post-Flashpoint

Post-DC Rebirth

Post-Dark Nights: Metal

Post-Dark Nights: Death Metal

Note: All bolded events are considered "company-wide".

Intercompany Crossovers

Notes

References

 
DC Comics-related lists
Comic book publication histories
Crossover comics
Intercompany crossovers